Consuelo Bland Marshall (born September 28, 1936) is a senior United States district judge of the United States District Court for the Central District of California.

Education and career

Born in Knoxville, Tennessee, Marshall received an Associate of Arts degree from Los Angeles City College in 1956. She received a Bachelor of Arts degree from Howard University in 1958. She received a Bachelor of Laws from Howard University School of Law in 1961. She was a deputy city attorney of Los Angeles City Attorney's Office from 1962 to 1967. She was in private practice of law in Los Angeles, California from 1968 to 1970. She was a Commissioner of the Juvenile Court of the Los Angeles County Superior Court from 1971 to 1976. She was a judge of the Civil and Criminal Division of the Inglewood Municipal Court in Inglewood, California from 1976 to 1977. She was a judge of the Criminal Division of the Los Angeles County Superior Court from 1977 to 1980.

Federal judicial service

Marshall was nominated by President Jimmy Carter on June 20, 1980, to a seat on the United States District Court for the Central District of California vacated by Judge Robert Firth. She was confirmed by the United States Senate on September 29, 1980, and received her commission on September 30, 1980. She served as Chief Judge from 2001 to 2005. She assumed senior status on October 24, 2005.

See also 
 List of African-American federal judges
 List of African-American jurists
 List of first women lawyers and judges in California

References

Sources
 

1936 births
Living people
African-American judges
California state court judges
Judges of the United States District Court for the Central District of California
United States district court judges appointed by Jimmy Carter
20th-century American judges
Howard University alumni
Howard University School of Law alumni
21st-century American judges
20th-century American women judges
21st-century American women judges